C. Herschel is a small lunar impact crater that lies on the western part of Mare Imbrium. It is named after German astronomer Caroline Herschel. It is a circular, bowl-shaped formation that has not undergone significant erosion. The interior floor has the same low albedo as the surrounding lunar mare. To the south-southwest is the similar crater Heis. C. Herschel lies on a wrinkle ridge of the lunar mare named the Dorsum Heim.

It was discovered by Karl Ludwig Harding between 1820 and 1924.

Satellite craters

By convention these features are identified on lunar maps by placing the letter on the side of the crater midpoint that is closest to C. Herschel.

References

 
 
 
 
 
 
 
 
 
 
 

Impact craters on the Moon
Mare Imbrium